Justin Madubuike (born November 17, 1997) is an American football defensive end for the Baltimore Ravens of the National Football League (NFL). He played college football at Texas A&M.

Early years
Madubuike was born in Dallas, Texas to Nigerian parents. Madubuike attended McKinney North High School in McKinney, Texas. He was selected to play in the 2016 U.S. Army All-American Game. He committed to Texas A&M University to play college football.

College career
Madubuike redshirted his first year at Texas A&M in 2016. In 2017, he appeared in all 13 games, recording 20 tackles. He again appeared in all 13 games in 2018, finishing with 40 tackles and 5.5 sacks. As a junior he had 45 tackles and 5.5 sacks. After the season, he decided to forgo his senior season and entered the 2020 NFL Draft. He decided to sit out the 2019 Texas Bowl.

Professional career

The Baltimore Ravens selected Madubuike with 71st overall pick in the third round of the 2020 NFL Draft. He was placed on the reserve/COVID-19 list by the team on November 27, 2020, and activated on December 7. 
In Week 16 against the New York Giants, Madubuike recorded his first career sack on Daniel Jones during the 27–13 win.

References

External links
Texas A&M Aggies bio

1997 births
Living people
People from McKinney, Texas
Players of American football from Texas
Sportspeople from the Dallas–Fort Worth metroplex
American football defensive tackles
American sportspeople of Nigerian descent
Texas A&M Aggies football players
Baltimore Ravens players